The Molniya (meaning "lightning"), GRAU Index 8K78, was a modification of the well-known R-7 Semyorka rocket and had four stages.

The 8K78 resulted from a crash program by the Korolev Bureau to develop a booster for launching planetary probes. A larger third stage was added along with a fourth stage (Blok L) that was designed to fire in-orbit to send the payload out of LEO. The basic R-7 core was also structurally strengthened and given more powerful engines. A rushed development produced multiple malfunctions of the upper stages, which led to its being replaced by the improved Molniya-M in 1964, but there were enough 8K78s left to continue flying them into 1967. The Molniya also carried early Venera probes to Venus.

Molniya (E6) was a minor revision adapted for launch of some Luna series space probes.

Characteristics 
 Length: 43.440 m
 Diameter: 10.300 m
 Launch mass: 305,000 kg

See also 
 Soyuz launch vehicle
 Voskhod rocket
 Venera 4V-2

References 

1960 in spaceflight
1961 in spaceflight
1962 in spaceflight
1963 in spaceflight
1973 in spaceflight
Space launch vehicles of the Soviet Union
R-7 (rocket family)